Frank P. Milano is an American attorney and jurist serving as a Judge of the New York Court of Claims. He previously served as acting Secretary of State of New York.

Education 
Milano earned a Bachelor of Science degree from the University of Pennsylvania and a Juris Doctor from Albany Law School.

Career 
Milano served for several years in the administration of Governor George Pataki as the First Deputy Secretary of State, and became acting Secretary of State of New York upon the resignation of Randy Daniels on September 23, 2005. He held this post until the appointment of Chris Jacobs in April 2006.

Milano served for over four years as the part-time town judge in Bethlehem, New York, a suburb of Albany. He was nominated by Pataki to the Court of Claims in June 2006, and was confirmed by the State Senate to a nine-year term.

References

Year of birth missing (living people)
Living people
Politicians from Albany, New York
Secretaries of State of New York (state)
New York (state) state court judges